, better known by her stage name , was a Japanese voice actress and singer from Kure, Hiroshima, best known for her work in anime. She was affiliated with 81 Produce at the time of her death.

After her announcement on July 14, 2015, Matsuki had been under treatment for acute pneumonia until her death on October 27, 2015 in Tokyo from lymphoma caused by chronic active EBV infection. At the time of her death, she was cast as Charlotte Dimandias in the anime Hundred. Her scheduled and ongoing roles were taken over by Yui Horie, Yumi Kakazu, Reina Ueda and Noriko Shitaya.

A charity event in her honour was held on September 11, 2016, at the Science Museum Hall in Chiyoda Ward, Tokyo, Japan. The 39! Miyu-chan event organized by her friends and colleagues had its proceeds go towards CAEBV research and related medical causes.

Filmography

TV anime

Ayakashi as Hime Yakushiji
ARIA The NATURAL as Ayano (ep 4)
Binchō-tan as Pukashū
Carnival Phantasm as Hisui
Chibi Maruko-chan as Koharu Nagayama (Second)
Claymore as Flora
D.C. ~Da Capo~ as Yoriko Sagisawa
D.C.S.S. ~Da Capo Second Season~ as Misaki Sagisawa
D-Frag! as Fukuko Nishinaga
Divergence Eve as Kotoko-01
Dog Days as Evita Sales
Dragon Drive as Sue
Fafner in the Azure as Shōko Hazama
Fate/kaleid liner Prisma Illya as Magical Sapphire
Final Approach as Akane Mizuhara
Fullmetal Alchemist as Sister (ep 16)
Fushigiboshi no Futagohime Gyu! as Sikanchi Minakan
Futari wa Pretty Cure Splash Star as Choppy
Glass Mask as Asako Hayagawa (ep 22)
Haibane Renmei as Haibane of Abandoned Factory
Nyaruko: Crawling with Love as Kūko
Hanbun no Tsuki ga Noboru Sora as Sayoko Natsume (ep 5,6)
Hand Maid May as Mie
Hayate no Gotoku! as Isumi Saginomiya
Hidamari Sketch as Yoshinoya
Hit wo Nerae! as Natsumi Yagami
Isekai no Seikishi Monogatari as Flora Nanadan
Kagihime Monogatari Eikyū Alice Rondo as Kisa Misaki
Kakyuusei as female student (ep 9); Mahoko's friend (ep 5)
Koi Kaze as Nanoka Kohinata (baby)
Konjiki no Gash Bell!! as Princess Pear
Kotori Samba as Merōnya
LOVE♥LOVE? as Natsumi Yagami
Magical Girl Lyrical Nanoha as Shinobu Tsukimura
Magical Girl Lyrical Nanoha A's as Lieze Lotte
MÄR as Chaton
Maria Holic as Ayari Shiki
Memories Off 2nd as Kana Maikata
Mezzo as Asami Igarashi
Mirmo Zibang! as Pikumo (Gaia Team)
Misaki Chronicles as Kotoko-02
Tsukuyomi -Moon Phase- as Kaoru Midō
Nakoruru as Mikato
Onegai My Melody as Aya Arai
Onegai My Melody: KuruKuru Shuffle! as Aya Arai
Onegai My Melody: Sukkiri as Aya Arai
Otome wa Boku ni Koishiteru as Shion Jūjō
Pani Poni Dash! as Media
Pocket Monsters Best Wishes! Season 2 as Cattleya
Romeo x Juliet as Cordelia
Rune Soldier as Anna
Ryūsei Sentai Musumet as Nako Seijō
Saki as Ichigo Sasano
Sayonara Zetsubou Sensei as Harumi Fujiyoshi
SD Gundam Force as Lilijimarna Miya Do Lacroa
Seven of Seven as Hitomi Onodera
Shimoneta as Anna Nishikinomiya
Simoun as Anguras (ep 8,17,18)
Soukou no Strain as Jesse Iges
Strawberry Panic! as Hikari Konohana
Tactics as Miyabi Suzakuin (ep 10,11)
Tamayura as Chimo Yakusa
The Cosmopolitan Prayers as Koto Hoshino / Mikorayer
The Third as Fairy (ep 13,14,16)
Tokimeki Memorial ~Only Love~ as Koayu Utsumi
True Love Story as Yuiko Shinosaka
W~Wish as Tomo Kishida
Yami to Bōshi to Hon no Tabibito as Milka

Film

Pretty Cure All Stars as Choppy
Futari wa PreCure Splash☆Star the Movie: Tic-Tac Crisis Hanging by a Thin Thread! as Choppy
Hayate the Combat Butler! Heaven Is a Place on Earth as Isumi Saginomiya
Jewelpet the Movie: Sweets Dance Princess as Macaronia
Major The Movie: Winning Shot of Friendship as Akihiko Sano
Yasai no Yousei: N.Y. Salad as White Eggplant

Video games

Akai Ito as Kei Hatō
Atelier Iris 3: Grand Phantasm as Iris Fortner
Castlevania Judgment as Maria Renard
Dungeon Travelers 2 as Maid-Sensei
Elsword as Ariel
Final Approach as Akane Mizuhara
Grand Chase as Arme Glenstid
Kashimashi ~Girl Meets Girl~ The First Summer Story as Kakeno Mine
Melty Blood as Hisui and MECH-Hisui
Musashi: Samurai Legend as Licotta
Mai-HiME: Unmei no Keitōju as Sakuya Amakawa
Phantom Breaker as Waka Kumon
Sentimental Prelude as Saori Shinohara
Solatorobo: Red the Hunter as Flo Financier
Strawberry Panic! as Hikari Konohana
Persona 5 (Chihaya Mifune)
Power DoLLS 1 as Azusa Yumi (operator)
Super Robot Wars Alpha 3 as Minaki Tōmine
Super Robot Wars UX (Shōko Hazama)
Tales of Zestiria (Lailah)
True Love Story -Summer Days, and yet... as Yuiko Shinosaka
The Legend of Heroes: Trails of Cold Steel as Claire Rieveldt

References

External links
  
 Official agency profile 
 

1977 births
2015 deaths
Deaths from cancer in Japan
Deaths from lymphoma
Japanese video game actresses
Japanese voice actresses
Japanese women singers
Keio University alumni
People from Kure, Hiroshima
Voice actresses from Hiroshima Prefecture
81 Produce voice actors